The Windmill British Cemetery is a Commonwealth War Graves Commission (CWGC) burial ground for the dead of World War I located near to the commune of Monchy-le-Preux on the main Arras to Cambrai road (D339) in the département of Pas-de-Calais, France.

The cemetery contains the graves of 368 known casualties and 35 unidentified.

History

The cemetery was first used in May 1917 by the 29th Division to bury the dead from the Second Battle of the Scarpe of the 23 April 1917. The cemetery continued to be used until March 1918 and then again between August and October 1918.

References

External links
 
 
 

Cemeteries in Pas-de-Calais
World War I cemeteries in France
Commonwealth War Graves Commission cemeteries in France
Canadian military memorials and cemeteries
1917 establishments in France
Works of Edwin Lutyens in France